Easy Money is a 1925 silent film directed by Albert S. Rogell and starring Cullen Landis and Mildred Harris.

A copy of the film is preserved at the Library of Congress.

Cast
Cullen Landis - Bud Parsons
Mildred Harris - Blanche Amory
Mary Carr - Mrs. Hale
Crauford Kent - Lewis
Gertrude Astor - Ellen Hale
Rex Lease - Red
David Kirby - William Hale

References

External links

1925 films
American silent feature films
American black-and-white films
1925 crime films
Rayart Pictures films
American crime films
Films directed by Albert S. Rogell
1920s English-language films
1920s American films